The Sunflour Railroad  is a short-line railroad which owns trackage in Roberts County and  Marshall County, South Dakota.   The company owns approximately 19 route-miles of track, between the towns of Rosholt and Claire City; the line connects with the Canadian Pacific Railway at Rosholt.

History 
The trackage now owned by Sunflour was originally constructed in 1913 by the Fairmount and Veblen Railway, a local shortline which extended from Fairmount, North Dakota to Grenville, South Dakota.  The railway was soon purchased by the Soo Line Railroad, and operated as a branch line; the portion of the branch from Veblen to Grenville was abandoned in 1971.  Sunflour purchased the Rosholt-Veblen trackage in 2000, after the Soo Line had requested permission to abandon that portion of the route. In 2012, the trackage from Veblen to Claire City was “abandoned”, even though the tracks and ties were removed years earlier.

Current operations 
The Sunflour Railroad apparently operated for only a short time, although the trackage remains intact in 2006.  The railroad's only locomotive, an EMD SW1 switcher, currently rests on a siding at Victor, South Dakota. The line currently serves as railcar storage for other railroads.

Name 
The Sunflour Railroad was an optional name in the developing process for the monopoly board game, hence where it got its name.

References

South Dakota railroads
2000 establishments in South Dakota
Transportation in Marshall County, South Dakota
Transportation in Roberts County, South Dakota
Spin-offs of the Canadian Pacific Railway
Railway services introduced in 1913
Railway services discontinued in 1971
1913 establishments in South Dakota
1971 disestablishments in South Dakota